The Commander of the Iranian Navy is the highest-ranking position of the Islamic Republic of Iran Navy, and has operational control and is responsible for overall operations of the navy. The current commander is Shahram Irani.

List of officeholders

|-
| colspan="7" align="center" bgcolor="white" | Commander of the Imperial Iranian Navy

| colspan="7" align="center" bgcolor="white" | Commander of the Islamic Republic of Iran Navy

References

 
 
Iran